Canaan Smith is the debut extended play (EP) by American country music singer Canaan Smith. It was released on March 24, 2015 via Mercury Nashville.

Critical reception
Bill Caruthers of Country Standard Time gave the EP a mixed review. He praised the lyrics of "Hole in a Bottle" and "Stuck", comparing the former favorably to the work of David Lee Murphy. He was less favorable toward "Love You Like That", which he said "it doesn't really distinguish itself musically from any number of similar anthems." Caruthers also thought that Smith "runs the risk here of being lost in a carbon-copy crowd."

Commercial performance
The album has sold 7,700 copies as of May 2015.

Track listing

Chart performance

References 

2015 debut EPs
Canaan Smith EPs
Mercury Nashville albums
Albums produced by Brett Beavers